Jacob William Hoffman (August 6, 1901 – June 6, 1994) was an American football guard who played three seasons with the Frankford Yellow Jackets of the National Football League (NFL). He played college football at Lehigh University and attended Easton Area High School in Easton, Pennsylvania. He was also a member of the Pottsville Maroons.

College career
Hoffman played college football for the Lehigh Mountain Hawks. New York writers named him to the All-Lehigh team in 1924.

Professional career
Hoffman signed with the Frankford Yellow Jackets of the NFL in 1924 and played for the team from 1924 to 1926, winning the NFL championship in 1926. He was a member of the NFL's Pottsville Maroons during the 1927 season.

References

External links
Just Sports Stats

1901 births
1994 deaths
American football guards
Easton Area High School alumni
Frankford Yellow Jackets players
Lehigh Mountain Hawks football players
Players of American football from Pennsylvania
Sportspeople from Northampton County, Pennsylvania